Teng Li (born in Nanjing, Jiangsu, China) is a Chinese Canadian violist. She is currently the principal violist of the Los Angeles Philharmonic. Li was the principal violist of the Toronto Symphony Orchestra from 2004 to 2018. Along with her TSO solo appearances,  Li has performed with the National Chamber Orchestra, the Santa Rosa Symphony, the Munich Chamber Orchestra, the Haddonfield Symphony, Shanghai Opera Orchestra, the Canadian Sinfonietta and Esprit Orchestra. Her performances have been broadcast on CBC Radio 2, National Public Radio, WQXR (New York), WHYY (Pennsylvania), WFMT (Chicago), and Bavarian Radio (Munich). Ms. Li is also an active recitalist and chamber musician participating in the festivals of Marlboro, Santa Fe, Mostly Mozart, Music from Angel Fire, Rome, Moritzburg (Germany) and the Rising Stars Festival in Caramoor. She has performed with the Guarneri Quartet in New York, at Carnegie Hall (Weill Recital Hall) and with the 92nd St. “Y” Chamber Music Society. Teng was also featured with the Guarneri Quartet in their last season (2009), and was also a member of the prestigious Lincoln Center Chamber Music Society Two Program.

Education and early career 

Teng is a graduate of the Curtis Institute of Music in Philadelphia.

Awards and Prizes 
Ms Li has won top Prizes at the Johanson International and the Holland-America Music Society competitions, the Primrose International Viola Competition, the Irving M. Klein International String Competition and the ARD International Music Competition in Munich, Germany. She was also a winner of the Astral Artistic Services 2003 National Auditions.

Recordings 

1939 – Teng Li, Benjamin Bowman, Meng-chieh Liu. Producers: David Jaeger, Teng Li, Ron Searles. Recorded at the Glenn Gould Studio, Toronto. Label: Azica Records. June 2015

Sources

External links 
 

Canadian violists
Chinese violists
Curtis Institute of Music alumni
Living people
Musicians from Nanjing
Year of birth missing (living people)